Bogdan Bondariew (born 2 June 1974 in Donetsk) is a Ukrainian former professional cyclist.

Major results

1995
 2nd  Team pursuit, UCI Track World Championships
2000
 1st Stage 3 Bałtyk–Karkonosze Tour
2001
 1st Stage 3 Tour de Pologne
 1st Stages 2 & 9 Peace Race
 1st Prologue Malopolski Wyscig Gorski
 1st Stage 5 Inter. Course 4 Asy Fiata Autopoland 
2002
 1st Memoriał Andrzeja Trochanowskiego
 1st Stage 1 Bałtyk–Karkonosze Tour
 1st Stage 2 Szlakiem Grodów Piastowskich
 1st Prologue & Stage 2 Inter. Course 4 Asy Fiata Autopoland
 2nd Time trial, National Road Championships
2003
 1st Stage 2 Szlakiem Grodów Piastowskich
 1st Stage 5 Dookoła Mazowsza
2004
 1st Overall Course de la Solidarité Olympique
1st Stage 3
 1st Overall Malopolski Wyscig Gorski
 6th Overall Bałtyk–Karkonosze Tour
2005
 1st Stage 3 Bałtyk–Karkonosze Tour
 8th Puchar Ministra Obrony Narodowej
2006
 1st Stages 6 & 9 Tour of Qinghai Lake
2007
 5th Puchar Ministra Obrony Narodowej

References

External links

1974 births
Living people
Ukrainian male cyclists
Ukrainian track cyclists
Sportspeople from Donetsk
Cyclists at the 1996 Summer Olympics
Olympic cyclists of Ukraine